The SIAI-Marchetti S.210 was a 1970s Italian twin-engined cabin-monoplane designed and built by SIAI-Marchetti as a development of the single-engined SIAI-Marchetti S.205.

Development
The S.210 was developed from the single-engined S.205 and was an all-metal low-wing cantilever monoplane with a retractable tricycle landing gear. It was powered by two 200 hp (149 kW) Avco Lycoming TIO-360-A1B engines, one mounted on the leading edge of each wing. It had three pairs of side-by-side seats for one pilot and five passengers. 

The prototype S.210M first flew on 18 February 1970 and was exhibited at the 1971 Paris Air Show wearing a military style colour scheme and markings. This aircraft was followed by an improved second prototype with increased baggage capacity and enlarged rear windows. A production batch of ten aircraft were built based on the second prototype.

Specifications (S.210)

See also

References

 

S.210
1970s Italian civil utility aircraft
Low-wing aircraft
Aircraft first flown in 1970
Twin piston-engined tractor aircraft